Michael Maluntsian ( Mikael Movsesi Maluntsyan; , , Baku, Russian Empire – 20 February 1973, Yerevan, Armenian SSR) was an Armenian conductor, cellist and pedagogue. People's Artist of Armenia. He worked with Armenian Philharmonic Orchestra as its artistic director and principal conductor in 1945–1960 and 1966–1967.

Maluntsyan was trained as a cellist at the Tbilisi Conservatory, and subsequently also graduated from the Moscow Conservatory in 1935, where he studied conducting. He was the conductor of the opera studio of Moscow conservatory from 1934 to 1945. In 1945 he led the chair of orchestra instruments of the Yerevan Conservatory.

References

Armenian musicians
1903 births
Armenian conductors (music)
1973 deaths
Soviet conductors (music)